Rolling Green Golf Club is a William Flynn designed golf course located in Springfield Township, Delaware County, Pennsylvania. Founded to be a "golf club meant for golfers", Rolling Green has always proudly been a golf-only facility, without country club frivolities such as tennis or swimming. It opened for play in 1926. Rolling Green was ranked the 17th best golf course in Pennsylvania by Golf Digest.

Tournaments at Rolling Green

Major championships

Amateur championships

Other championships

Scorecard

References

External links

Golf clubs and courses in Pennsylvania
1926 establishments in Pennsylvania